CRG is a kart chassis manufacturer of recent years. Famous alumni include Alex Zanardi, Vitantonio Liuzzi, Lewis Hamilton and Max Verstappen.

They were founded in the late 1970s by three Italian racers (Carlo Vanaria, Roberto Vanaria and Giancarlo Tinini), and were originally known as Kali Karts. In the beginning the company was a laughing stock, with Zanardi being told by his original team DAP that if he didn't stop complaining they would "send him to Kali". By the mid 1980s Kali had recovered from its inauspicious beginnings and was winning World Championships with drivers like Mike Wilson.

The name change to CRG took place gradually in the early 1990s and ushered in an era of more World Championships from Danilo Rossi and Alessandro Manetti. CRG also goes under the name of Tinini Group, which was created in 2017. And visible on all sticker kits since then. CRG has also a straight relation with Dino Chiesa (Chiesa Corse). The Italian chassis mechanic (known as the best in the world of karting) assisted the multiple world champions, Alessandro Piccini and Giorgio Pantano; as well as many other drivers through CRG.

CRG started to build engines in the mid-1990s but they were never widely used outside of the factory teams. In 2001 they were replaced by the Maxter brand which produces 100 cc and 125 cc gearbox engines. They also have been involved in the Maxter engine range. And they were the main supplier for a couple of brands like Maranello, Vanspeed, Zanardi, Dino,  DR Kart. In more recent years the team has partnered up with TM racing.

In the past 30 years, CRG has been one of the most successful brands and it has been chosen by several of the current motorsport champions. For this reason, CRG Racing team is considered as the “Champions Factory”. Champions of the likes of Michael Schumacher, Max Verstappen, Alessandro Zanardi, Ralf Schumacher, Giancarlo Fisichella, Nick Heidfeld, Jan Magnussen, Jos Verstappen, Giorgio Pantano, Tonio Liuzzi, Nico Rosberg, Lewis Hamilton, Kimi Raikkonen, Robert Kubica, Sébastien Buemi, Nico Hulkenberg, Pastor Maldonado, Giedo Van der Garde.

WORLD CHAMPIONSHIPS & WORLD CUPS

EUROPEAN CHAMPIONSHIP

References

External links
 Official website

Kart manufacturers of Italy